Andasta benoiti is a species of ray spider that is endemic to the Seychelles. It is found on the islands of Mahé, Conception, Thérèse, North, Praslin, Marianne, Felicite and Denis. It is found in coastal woodlands. It is threatened by coastal development and habitat degradation from invasive plants, especially Cinnamomum verum.

References

Theridiosomatidae
Vulnerable animals
Endemic fauna of Seychelles
Spiders of Africa
Spiders described in 1978